Sir or Madam (German: Ossi hat die Hosen an) is a 1928 British-German silent comedy film directed by Carl Boese and starring Margot Armand, Percy Marmont and Ossi Oswalda. It was based on the 1923 novel Sir or Madame by Berta Ruck and shot at Elstree Studios near London. The film was a co-production between Germany and Britain, with separate versions released in the countries. In Britain it was not released until February 1930.

Plot
A woman disguises herself as a man, and poses as a gentleman's valet. She then has to resist the advances of his vampish fiancee.

Cast
Margot Armand as Patricia Lloyd
Percy Marmont Sir Ralph Wellalone
Ossi Oswalda as Geulda Rhos
Annette Benson as Lady Day
Hannelore Benzinger
Olga Engl
Cara Guyl
Fritz Kampers
Fred Leslie
Hilde Maroff
Sophie Pagay
Karl Platen
Anna Stranz-Führing
Wolfgang Zilzer
Charles Ashton
Harold Huth
Lena Halliday
Edith Barker-Bennett

References

Bibliography
Wood, Linda. British Films, 1927-1939. British Film Institute, 1986.

External links

1928 comedy films
British comedy films
German comedy films
Films directed by Carl Boese
British silent feature films
German silent feature films
Films based on British novels
Films set in England
Films shot at British International Pictures Studios
British black-and-white films
National Film films
1920s British films
Silent comedy films
1920s German films